Brunhilde Hendrix (2 August 1938 in Langenzenn – 28 November 1995 in Sachsen bei Ansbach) was a West German athlete who competed mainly in the 100 metres.

Hendrix competed for the United Team of Germany in the 1960 Summer Olympics held in Rome, Italy in the 4×100 metres where she won the silver medal with her teammates Martha Langbein, Anni Biechl and Jutta Heine.

Both her parents (mother Marie Dollinger and father Friedrich Hendrix) were successful athletes who competed in Olympic Games, too.

References

1938 births
1995 deaths
German female sprinters
Athletes (track and field) at the 1960 Summer Olympics
Olympic athletes of the United Team of Germany
Olympic silver medalists for the United Team of Germany
People from Langenzenn
Sportspeople from Middle Franconia
Medalists at the 1960 Summer Olympics
Olympic silver medalists in athletics (track and field)
Olympic female sprinters